Silvia Bottini (born 30 October 1981) is an Italian actress and model.  She has frequently collaborated with Silvio Raffo.

Early life 
Bottini was born on 30 October 1981 in Malnate, a town in the province of Varese, Italy.

Career 
Upon graduation, she joined  in Genoa as one of two applicants accepted out of 300. Some of her castings during this time were in 's Il fantoccio, 's Generazioni Componibili and Jon Fosse's Svevn (in Italian translation).

She has collaborated with Silvio Raffo on several projects, including stage performances of Ovid's poetry and other works.

Bottini moved to Los Angeles, in the U.S. in 2015. She is a cast member of the Italian Comedy Club in Los Angeles. Besides acting, she has also worked as a make-up artist. She worked on the Los Angeles part of the 2017 music video for "Senza Pagare" by J-Ax, Fedez, and T-Pain; the shoot also featured Paris Hilton, Pio e Amedeo, and Ferragni.

Internet meme 

In 2008, Bottini was in a relationship with a stock photographer.  While they were vacationing in Shanghai, she modeled for several of his photos, including one with her crying.  In 2011, she found that the stock photograph of her crying was being used as an Internet meme, satirizing people who complain about "First World problems" (for example, "there's not enough dressing on my salad").  Bottini initially disliked the meme as trivializing her acting career, especially since she received no royalties from them.  By 2019, she told BBC News that she had reconciled with her Internet fame, and was working on a short film about the "First World Problems" character.

Bottini included the meme as part of her supporting documentation when applying for a U.S. extraordinary ability visa.  Her application was successful.

Partial filmography 

 Il cantico di Maddalena (2011)
 Fragile (2011)
 Bella addormentata (2012)

References

External links 

Silvia Bottini on IMDb
Silvia Bottini on Flickr
Silvia Bottini on Getty Images
Interview (2021) with Know Your Meme

Living people
1981 births
Italian female models
Italian actresses
Italian Internet celebrities
Internet memes introduced in 2011

People from Varese